Edward Hirst is a picture editor, photographer, videographer specialising in TV, film, music, unit still photography, documentary media and social commentary. He is also a security researcher and media and technical consultant.

In recent years his work has focused on issues surrounding diversity, social inclusion and ethics. On the technical side he has written about information security and data security.

Based in London he has been a photographer, photojournalist and videographer since 1986. His work has been published on the covers of all the main UK national newspapers and many magazines in the UK and worldwide. Video footage he has shot has been used on television shows in the UK and abroad. He has been interviewed on TV and radio discussing the media and endorsing an ethical respectful approach to media coverage.

Acting
 "Call Me a Cabbie" - Episode #2.6 (2007) TV episode - Photographer

Radio
 "Kate Middleton and the Media - BBC World Service (09012007)" Interview - Media Commentator

Unit Photography
 "Call Me a Cabbie" (still photographer) Series 1 & 2 - (13 episodes, 2006–2007)
 "Straight Dates by Gay Mates" (2003) TV series (still photographer) (2003)
 So Graham Norton (still photographer) (16 episodes, 1999–2000)
 FY2K: Graham Norton Live - Millennium Show (1999) (TV) (still photographer)

References

English photojournalists
Photographers from London
Living people
Movie stills photographers
Year of birth missing (living people)